Winnambool is a locality in Victoria, Australia, located approximately 47 km from Ouyen, Victoria.

References

Towns in Victoria (Australia)
Rural City of Swan Hill